Kabataş Boys High School is one of the oldest and most prominent high schools in Turkey. It is located in Ortaköy at Bosphorus in Istanbul.

History 
The high school was established in 1908 by the Ottoman sultan Abdulhamid II. Kabataş Mekteb-i İdadisi had served to raise qualified leaders for the Ottoman Empire for 15 years. After Turkey became a republic in 1923, the institution became a standard high school with its new name: Kabataş Erkek Lisesi. Owing to the inadequacy of the building used by the school, Kabataş Erkek Lisesi had to move to the nearby Feriye Palaces, where the relatives of Sultans -the royal families- had previously been accommodated. Feriye Palaces are known for not only their fascinating view of the Bosphorus but also an unfortunate event, the imprisonment and alleged murder of Sultan Abdülaziz II, which took place in the buildings. During the Balkan Wars, Kabataş sent numerous students to the battlefront. In the early years, only boys were educated at the high school. However, as of 1994, girls have also been admitted to the school .

Later in the first half of the 20th century, the Dormitory and the Dining Hall were added to the buildings of Kabataş Erkek Lisesi as well as the building that contained the Conference Hall and the laboratories. With the admission of female students at the high school in 1994 and the establishment of English preparatory classes in 1997, this very school has confirmed its prominent place in the field of education of the country. Due to the quality of education it has provided and the success it has proven, Kabataş Erkek Lisesi was promoted to an Anatolian High School in 1998. In 2006, the duration of education in high school was increased to 5 years.

After 114 years from its establishment, Kabataş Erkek Lisesi still stands as one of the most successful educational institutions of the country with its high-standard education, international recognition and glorified students  .

Kabataş High School celebrated its 114rd anniversary in 2022 with a festival.

Directors of the school

Ottoman Empire period 

 Hasan Tahsin Ayni (1908-1908)
 Lütfü Emiroğlu (1908-1911)
 Hüseyin Mazım (1911-1914)
 M. Sait Erkol (1914-1917)
 Abdülkerim Nadir (1917-1922)

Turkish Republic Period 
 M. Edip Ergun (1922-1931)
 Mahmut Ekrem (1931-1932)
 Nuri Onur (1932-1949)
 Cemal Artüz (1949-1951)
 Faik Dranaz (1951-1958)
 Adnan Dinçer (1958-1974)
 M. Nihat Tünaydın (1974-1980)
 A. Azmi Güler (1980-1985)
 Korel Haksun (1985-2005)
 Recep Memiş (2005-2010)
 Uğur Açıkgöz (2010-2012)
 Fatih Güldal (2015-2018)
 Selman Küçük (2018-2021)
 Muharrem Bayrak (2021- )

Notable alumni 

 Adnan Kahveci – politician former Minister of Finance
 Ahmet Taner Kışlalı – politician, former Minister of Culture, writer
 Ahmet Yalçınkaya – poet and writer
 Ali Akansu – Professor, electrical and computer engineering
 Ali Bayramoğlu – businessman
 Ali İhsan Göğüş – Former Tourism Minister
 Ali Uras – Former President of Galatasaray S.K. and Turkish Football Federation
 Ergican Saydam – pianist
 Erkan Oğur - guitarist
 Erol Çevikçe – former Minister of Environment and City Planning
 Fahri Kasırga – former Minister of Justice
 Feridun Karakaya – actor
 Gülhan Şen – television presenter
 Hasan Gemici – former Minister of State
 Hikmet Sami Türk – former Minister of Justice
  – lawyer, journalist, writer 
  – former president of Istanbul Technical University
 Küçük İskender – writer, poet
 Naim Talu – former Prime Minister
 Mehmet Köksal  – lawyer
 Muhammad Ahmad al-Mangoush – former prime minister of Libya
 Murat Soygeniş – architect, professor
 Namık Gedik – former Minister of the Interior
 Nahit Menteşe – former deputy prime minister and Minister of the Interior
 Necati Çelim – former MP for Aydın Province and gynecologist
 Nusret Fişek – former Minister of Health
 Ömer Kavur – film director
 Özdemir Asaf – poet
  – honorary attorney prosecutor of Court of Cassation of Turkey
 Süleyman Seba – former president and honorary president of Beşiktaş J.K.
 Sanlı Sarıalioğlu – former player for Beşiktaş J.K. and the Turkey national football team
 Şeref Has – former player for Fenerbahçe S.K. and the Turkey national football team
 Yalçın Küçük – writer and researcher
 Yaşar Kaya – politician and journalist

See also 
 List of schools in Istanbul

External links 
 High school's official website
 Kabataş Erkek Lisesi alumni association
 High school's educational foundation
 Kabataş Erkek Lisesi fan website

Educational institutions established in 1908
Bosphorus
High schools in Istanbul
Beşiktaş
1908 establishments in the Ottoman Empire
Boarding schools in Turkey